Svensk Hyllningsfest ("Swedish Honoring Festival") is a biennial celebration held in Lindsborg, Kansas, in October of odd-numbered years to celebrate the Swedish heritage of the community. The festival includes Swedish dancing, foods (including lutfisk), cooking demonstrations, arts and crafts, entertainment by local artists and musicians, a parade, and a smörgåsbord.  Events included at the festival are dancing, cooking demonstrations, arts, crafts, musical entertainment, and folk dancing, provided by town residents. 400 students begin learning dances for this event in the 1st grade and practices for the festival begin early in the school year. High school students participate as part of the Lindsborg Swedish Folk Dancers, a group of select high school students that agree to participate for four years as ambassadors for the Lindsborg community. Svensk Hyllningsfest is just one of their many performances.

History
Svensk Hyllningsfest first started in 1941, but wasn't held in 1943. The most recent Svensk Hyllningsfest was held on October 8 and 9, 2021.

See also
 Swedish festivities
 List of festivals in the United States

References

Cultural festivals in the United States
Festivals in Kansas
Swedish migration to North America
Tourist attractions in McPherson County, Kansas
Swedish-American culture in Kansas
Lindsborg, Kansas
Biennial events